Laurie Carney is a Canadian former curler.

Awards
British Columbia Sports Hall of Fame: 1990, with all Linda Moore 1985 team.
North Shore Sports Hall of Fame: 2019, with all Linda Moore 1985 team.

Teams

References

External links
 
 Laurie Carney – Curling Canada Stats Archive

Living people
Canadian women curlers
Curlers from British Columbia
World curling champions
Canadian women's curling champions
Year of birth missing (living people)